Extatosoma popa is a species of stick insect in the genus Extatosoma from New Guinea.  The subspecies: E. popa carlbergi (Beccaloni, 1993) previously was recognised.

References

External links
Phasmid Study Group: Extatosoma popa carlbergi

Phasmatodea
Insects of Australia